Dugger may refer to:

 Andrew N. Dugger (1886–1975), American religious leader
 Celia W. Dugger (born 1958), American journalist and science editor
 Dean Dugger (1933–2000), American college football player
 Dorothy Dugger, first female manager of the San Francisco Bay Area Rapid Transit (2007–2011)
 Doug Dugger (1926–2005), American country music singer
 Edward Dugger (1894–1939), African-American lieutenant colonel
 Jack Dugger (1923–1988), American National Football League and National Basketball League player
 Kyle Dugger (born 1996), American National Football League player
 Richard L. Dugger, Secretary of the Florida Department of Corrections from 1987 to 1991
 Robert Dugger (born 1995), American baseball player
 Ronnie Dugger (born 1931), progressive Texas journalist
 Tom J. Dugger (born 1948), elected Oklahoma state senator in 2015
 William Dugger, Arkansas state senator in 1871
 The Duggar family, featured on the reality television series 19 Kids and Counting

See also
 Duggar (disambiguation)
 Düğer, Burdur, Turkey, a village